Trachinocephalus is a genus of fish in the family Synodontidae found in Atlantic, Indian and Pacific Ocean.

Species
There are currently 3 recognized species in this genus:
 Trachinocephalus gauguini Polanco F., Acero P & Betancur-R., 2016 
 Trachinocephalus myops (J. R. Forster, 1801) (Blunt-nose lizardfish)
 Trachinocephalus trachinus (Temminck & Schlegel, 1846)

References

Synodontidae
Fish of the Atlantic Ocean
Fish of the Indian Ocean
Fish of the Pacific Ocean